Master Kong is the largest instant noodle producer in China.

Established in 1991, Master Kong is a branded company headquartered in Shanghai and Tianjin. It specializes in the production and distribution of instant noodles, beverages, cakes and relevant supporting industries. In 1996, it was listed in Hong Kong and is currently constituent of MSCI China Index and the Hang Seng China 100 Index.

In 2019, Master Kong achieved revenue of 61.978 billion yuan, a year-on-year increase of 2.13%; achieved net profit of 3.331 billion yuan, a year-on-year increase of 35.22%. According to Nielsen, the sales volume of Master Kong instant noodles in 2019 accounted for 43.3% of market shares, ranking first in the market. According to Kantar, in 2019, Master Kong's juice ranks second in juice market penetration. Meanwhile, the penetration of Master Kong RTD tea reached 38%, 10 percentage points higher than the second.

In November 2011, Master Kong and PepsiCo established a strategic alliance for the production and sales of all non-alcoholic beverages in China. In March 2015, Master Kong and Starbucks officially entered into cooperation agreement for the production and sales of Starbucks bottled and canned ready-to-drink products in China.

In June 2018, Master Kong was shortlisted in the national brand project of Xinhua News Agency.

History
The company was founded in Tianjin by the Wei brothers from Changhua County, Taiwan in 1991. It was listed on the Hong Kong Stock Exchange in 1996.

It is a wholly owned subsidiary of Ting Hsin International Group.

In March 2011, Unilever was fined 2 million Yuan for the distribution of information about future price hikes and Tingyi was given a warning about publicly discussing their price increases.

In June 2011, Master Kong was recognized by market research firm, TNS, to be the second most valued brand in China.

As of 2013, its main competitors are Want Want China and Uni-President.

In 2014, Master Kong was facing the food safety problem in Taiwan.

In 2015, Master Kong stopped distributing its instant noodles in Taiwan. The group's board of directors has approved a plan to completely withdraw from the Taiwanese market.

See also
Master Kong Chef's Table

References

External links
Tingyi (Cayman Islands) Holding Corporation (Mainland China)
Tingyi (Cayman Islands) Holding Corporation (Taiwan)

Companies listed on the Hong Kong Stock Exchange
Food and drink companies established in 1991
Companies based in Tianjin
Privately held companies of China
Food and drink companies of China
Food and drink companies of Taiwan
Multinational companies
Chinese brands
1991 establishments in China
Chinese companies established in 1991
Former companies in the Hang Seng Index